Ian Karmel (born October 9, 1984) is an American stand-up comedian and writer. He is currently the co-head writer for CBS’ The Late Late Show with James Corden. He wrote for the 2017 and 2018 Grammy Awards as well as the 2016 Tony Awards. His work on the 2016 Tony Awards earned him an Emmy Award nomination for Outstanding Writing for a Variety Special. His work on Carpool Karaoke: When Corden Met McCartney Live From Liverpool won him an Emmy in 2019.

Early life
Karmel was born into a Jewish family in Portland, Oregon and raised in Beaverton. He graduated from Westview High School, and subsequently earned a bachelor's degree in political science from Portland State University.

Career 
Karmel trained at the Los Angeles improv company The Groundlings and the Upright Citizens Brigade. He has been a regular contributor to the Portland Mercury, writing the weekly column "Everything as F*ck".  

He made his late night debut in 2014 on TBS' Conan, and was also in 2014 featured on Comedy Central's Adam DeVine's House Party Season 2.

In 2015, he released his album 9.2 on Pitchfork through the Portland label Kill Rock Stars.

Karmel was featured in the Netflix 15-minute standup special series The Comedy Lineup, which premiered on July 3, 2018. 

Karmel's other TV credits include IFC's sketch comedy series Portlandia and the Travel Channel's food reality TV series Adam Richman's Best Sandwich in America. He has been a guest post-game analyst and commentator for the Portland Trail Blazers.

He also serves as the lead voice and creative force behind the weekly podcast All Fantasy Everything on the HeadGum network.

Filmography

Television

References

External links
 

1984 births
Living people
American stand-up comedians
American male television actors
American television writers
American male television writers
Male actors from Oregon
American sketch comedians
Jews and Judaism in Portland, Oregon
People from Beaverton, Oregon
Portland State University alumni
21st-century American comedians
Comedians from Oregon
Screenwriters from Oregon
21st-century American screenwriters
21st-century American male writers